Nurminen is a Finnish surname. Notable people with the surname include:

Aili Nurminen, (1896–1972), Finnish meteorologist 
Ilmari Nurminen, Finnish politician
Jari Nurminen (born 1961), Finnish racing driver
Julius Nurminen (1887–1918), Finnish journalist and politician
Jyrki Nurminen (born 1990), Finnish beach volleyball player
Kai Nurminen (born 1969), Finnish ice hockey player
Pasi Nurminen (born 1975), Finnish ice hockey player
Simo Nurminen (born 1949), Finnish orienteer
Uno Nurminen (1895–1972), Finnish trade unionist, civil servant and politician

References

Finnish-language surnames